The Oscar Robertson Trophy is given out annually to the outstanding men's college basketball player by the United States Basketball Writers Association (USBWA). The trophy is considered to be the oldest of its kind and has been given out since 1959.

History
USBWA College Player of the Year was started in 1959, which makes it the oldest running trophy for the college player of the year. The USBWA annually selects a player of the year and All-America teams for both men and women in college basketball. The USBWA men's player of the year award is now called the Oscar Robertson Trophy.

The USBWA also selects a national coach of the year for men and women, with the men's award named after legendary coach Henry Iba. It was renamed after the college and professional legend Oscar Robertson in 1998. Five nominees are presented and the individual with the most votes receives the award during the NCAA Final Four. The Oscar Robertson Trophy, previously known as the Player of the Year Award, was renamed in 1998 because of Robertson's outstanding career (including winning the first two awards) and his continuing efforts to promote the game of basketball. He averaged 32.6 points per game in his sophomore year at Cincinnati.

Key

Winners

See also
List of U.S. men's college basketball national player of the year awards

References

College basketball player of the year awards in the United States
Awards established in 1959